Gustavo Klismahn Dimaraes Miranda (born 23 November 1999), sometimes known as just Klismahn, is a Brazilian professional footballer who plays as a midfielder for Portimonense.

Professional career
Klismahn is a youth product of the Brazilian club Desportivo Brasil, before moving to the U23 side of Estoril between 2018 and 2021. In the summer of 2021, he transferred to Alverca in the Liga 3 on 15 July 2021. After a successful season, he moved to the Primeira Liga side Portimonense on 13 July 2022. He made his professional debut with Portimonense in a 1–0 Primeira Liga win over C.S. Marítimo on 27 August 2022, coming on as a substitute in the 73rd minute.

Personal life
Klismahn was named by his father after the German footballer Jürgen Klinsmann.

References

External links
 

1999 births
Living people
Sportspeople from Pará
Brazilian footballers
Association football midfielders
F.C. Alverca players
Portimonense S.C. players
Primeira Liga players
Campeonato de Portugal (league) players
Brazilian expatriate footballers
Brazilian expatriates in Portugal